Shaun Press (born 9 October 1966) is a Papua New Guinean chess player and official. He holds the titles of FIDE Master (FM) and International Arbiter (IA).

Chess career
Born in Port Moresby, Press represented Papua New Guinea in seven Chess Olympiads from 2000 to 2012. His best result was scoring 6/9 points, and finishing 13th on board 3, at the 35th Chess Olympiad in Bled 2002. Press was awarded the title of FIDE Master in 2012 for this result. He refused to submit to doping control at the 36th Chess Olympiad in Calvia 2004, and his points were subtracted from the Papua New Guinea team's score.

Press won the 2009 Solomon Islands International with a score of 7½/9 points. He was awarded the title of International Arbiter by FIDE in 2010. Press finished second in the Oceania zonal tournament 2019 in Guam and qualified for the FIDE World Cup 2019.

Press is currently the Magazine Editor of the Correspondence Chess League of Australia (CCLA). He is now serving as the Secretary of the Qualifications Commission and current Zonal President of Oceania.

References

External links
 
 

1966 births
Living people
Papua New Guinean chess players
Chess FIDE Masters
Chess Olympiad competitors
People from the National Capital District (Papua New Guinea)
Chess arbiters